The 2021 Uruguayan Segunda División was the season of second division professional of football in Uruguay. A total of 12 teams competed; the top two teams and the winner of the Championship play-offs were promoted to the Uruguayan Primera División.

Club information

Standings

Promotion Playoffs

Semi-finals

First Leg

Second Leg

Racing and Defensor Sporting advanced to the Finals due to having a better campaign.

Finals

Defensor Sporting won 3–0 on aggregate and were promoted to Primera División.

Relegation

Relegation playoffs

Tied 3–3 on aggregate. La Luz won on penalties and were promoted to Segunda División.

Reference

See also
2021 in Uruguayan football

Uruguayan Segunda División seasons
2